Women's suffrage in Peru was introduced on communal level in 1932 and on national level on 7 September 1955.   It was the second to last country in South America to introduce women's suffrage.

The issue was first suggested by senator Celso Bambaren Ramírez in 1867. In the early 20th-century, the issue was beginning to be lifted in public debate by  pioneering women's activists such as Maria Jesus Alvarado, Zoila Aurora Cáceres, Adela Montesinos, Elvira Garcia y Garcia and Magda Portal, and Maria Jesus Alvarado was the first Peruan woman to support women's suffrage in public in 1911. The Parliament first took up the issue in 1931–1932, a debate which ended in a compromise, in which communal suffrage was introduced. Women's suffrage on a national level was introduced by the government of Manuel A. Odría in 1955. The reason was reportedly that he wished the support of women voters on the upcoming election of 1956.

References 

Peru
Feminism and history
Women's rights in Peru